Adrien Alpini (9 December 1889 – 12 December 1950) was a French racing cyclist. He rode in the 1920 Tour de France.

References

1889 births
1950 deaths
French male cyclists
Place of birth missing